Bear Creek is a stream in Montgomery and Warren counties in the U.S. state of Missouri. It is a tributary of the Loutre River.

Bear Creek was so named on account of bears in the area.

See also
List of rivers of Missouri

References

Rivers of Montgomery County, Missouri
Rivers of Warren County, Missouri
Rivers of Missouri